is an English contract law case on misrepresentation. It examines the Misrepresentation Act 1967 and addresses the extent of damages available under s 2(1) for negligent misrepresentation.

The court controversially decided that under the Act, the appropriate measure of damages was the same as that for common law fraud, or damages for all losses flowing from a misrepresentation, even if unforeseeable. The reasoning of the decision has been much criticised by academic lawyers such as Treitel and Hooley, partly for its overly literal interpretation of the statute, and for its dubious finding of fact that a deliberately false document was made negligently, rather than fraudulently.

Facts
Rogerson acquired  on hire purchase a used Honda Prelude from a car dealer, Maidenhead Honda Centre Ltd. The car was priced at £7600, Rogerson paying a £1200 deposit, some 15.8% of the total. The balance came from a finance company, Royscot Trust Ltd. On Rogerson's behalf, the dealer filled in the application forms, falsely misrepresenting that the total cost was £8000 and the deposit was £1600 (20% of the total). Royscot approved the loan; but, had accurate figures been stated, they would have refused finance since its policy was not to lend money if the deposit was less than 20%.

Rogerson began paying instalments, but in due course had cashflow difficulties. In August 1987 he dishonestly sold the car, knowing the car was not yet his to sell. A year later, he informed the finance company of the sale, and stopped paying instalments in September 1988, leaving the balance unpaid.

Royscot sued the car dealer in damages, alleging that they had relied upon the dealer's misrepresentation, which induced them into the finance plan. Fraud was not mentioned, but Royscot claimed that had the dealer given the correct figures, they would have refused finance, and that the £3,625·24 loss was the dealer's fault. The dealer countered that the actual cause of Royscot's loss was Rogerson's unlawful sale of the car, since, if he had not sold it, Royscot would be entitled to its repossession. The dealer alleged Rogerson's unlawful sale broke the chain of causation between any misrepresentation and Royscot's loss.

Judgment
Balcombe LJ and Ralph Gibson LJ held:
 That for negligent misrepresentation under s.2(1), the correct measure of damages was tortious and the same as that for the tort of deceit. 
 The car dealer was liable for all the consequences of his misrepresentation, and therefore had to pay the losses incurred by Royscot Trust Ltd.
 Rogerson's wrongful sale of the car was foreseeable and not a break in the chain of causation.

The following passage of Balcombe LJ's judgment is key:
B

Case summary
The case caused some alarm among academic and practising lawyers. Given the relative lack of blameworthiness of a non-fraudulent defendant (who is at worst merely careless, and at best has an honest belief on reasonable grounds) for many years lawyers presumed that for non-fraudulent misrepresentation damages would be on a contract/negligence basis requiring reasonable foreseeability of loss.

Royscot Trust Ltd v Rogerson changed all that. The court gave a literal interpretation of s.2 (which, to paraphrase, provides  that where a person has been misled by an innocent misrepresentation  then, if the misrepresentor would be liable to damages had the representation been made fraudulently, that person "shall be so liable"). The phrase "shall be so liable" was read literally to mean "as liable as for fraudulent misrepresentation". So, under the Misrepresentation Act 1967, damages for innocent misrepresentation are calculated as if the defendant had been fraudulent, despite the absence of deceit.

Although this was almost certainly not the intention of Parliament, no changes to the law have been made to address this discrepancy. This is known as the fiction of fraud and also extends to tortious liability. (S.2 does not specify how "damages in lieu" should be determined, and interpretation of this point is up to the courts).

It is also unclear why the dealer's misrepresentation should have been considered "non-fraudulent" when it seems plain that the dealer deliberately misled the finance company. Arguably, this case should have been considered "fraudulent" as it complied with the 3-part guidelines of Derry v Peek. Since no reference was made to Derry v Peek, this case is open to challenge as per incuriam.

See also
Doyle v Olby (Ironmongers) Ltd [1969] 2 QB 158

Notes

English misrepresentation case law
Court of Appeal (England and Wales) cases
1991 in case law
1991 in British law